Babs is a BBC biopic about the life of British actress Dame Barbara Windsor. Details of the film were announced by Charlotte Moore, the BBC's Acting Director of Television, on 26 May 2016, a week after Windsor made her final appearance in EastEnders as the long-running character Peggy Mitchell. The film, written by EastEnders scriptwriter Tony Jordan, shows Windsor in the 1990s as she prepares to go on stage and recalls events from her life, including her childhood and marriage to gangster Ronnie Knight, as well as her rise to fame as part of the Carry On cast. It was broadcast on 7 May 2017, to coincide with Windsor's 80th birthday. Upon the announcement of the project, Windsor spoke of her delight that Jordan had been chosen to write the screenplay: "Tony knows the real me and what makes me tick and I was particularly taken by the way he wants to tell my tale which is not in the way people will expect it to be. [...] I am honoured and excited that Tony and the BBC have commissioned this." Windsor's cameo appearance was her last performance as an actor.

Cast
 Jaime Winstone as Barbara 
 Barbara Windsor as Herself
 Honor Kneafsey as Barbara Ann Deeks
 Samantha Spiro as Babs (Spiro reprises her role from the stage play Cleo, Camping, Emmanuelle and Dick and the ITV film adaptation Cor, Blimey! from 2000.)
 Nick Moran as John Deeks
 Leanne Best as Rose Deeks
 Zoë Wanamaker as Joan Littlewood

References

External links

2017 in British television
2017 television films
2017 films
BBC television dramas
British television films
Films about television
Films about actors